The Athena II is an American small expendable launch system which was used for three launches between 1998 and 1999, and which was scheduled to return to service in 2012 but has not been flown again . It is a member of the Athena family of rockets, along with the smaller Athena I. 

The Athena II is a four-stage rocket, consisting of solid first, second and third stages, and a monopropellant liquid-fueled fourth stage. The first and second stages are Castor 120s, which are also used on some versions of the Taurus rocket. An Orbus 21D motor was used as the third stage on launches during the 1990s. A planned second generation Athena II launch vehicle will use a Castor 30 third stage which is under currently under development for the Taurus II. The fourth stage is an Orbital Adjustment Module, fueled by hydrazine and propelled by four MR-107 engines, which is used for final insertion.

Prior to its retirement in 1999, Athena II launches were made from Launch Complex 46 at Spaceport Florida and Space Launch Complex 6 at Vandenberg Air Force Base. LC-46 will also be used for Athena IIc launches, with Launch Pad 0B of the Mid-Atlantic Regional Spaceport and Pad 1 of the Kodiak Launch Complex also offered. 

During the 1990s, three Athena II launches were conducted, with one failure. Its maiden flight was conducted from LC-46 at Spaceport Florida, and lifted off at 02:28 GMT on 7 January 1997. The launch, which was the first to take place from Spaceport Florida, successfully placed the Lunar Prospector spacecraft into orbit for NASA. The next Athena II launch took place from SLC-6 at Vandenberg on 27 April 1999, with the Ikonos satellite for Space Imaging. The launch ended in failure after the payload fairing failed to separate, and as a result the rocket had too much mass to achieve orbital velocity. The third launch also took place from SLC-6 at Vandenberg, on 24 September 1999. The payload, Ikonos 1, was also for Space Imaging, and successfully reached orbit.

See also
ALV X-1
Comparison of small lift launch systems
Comparison of solid-fuelled orbital launch systems
Taurus II

References

Rockets and missiles